Ghalib is a 1961 Pakistani black and white biographical drama film based on the life of famous Urdu poet, Mirza Asadullah Khan Ghalib. The film was directed and produced by Atta Ullah Hashmi, and the story was written by Shatir Ghaznavi with dialogue by Agha Shorish Kashmiri. The film stars Sudhir in the titular role of Ghalib while Noor Jehan played his love interest and also sang songs for the film.

It also marked her last film as an actor after which she shifted her focus towards singing completely.

Cast 
 Sudhir as Mirza Asadullah Khan Ghalib
 Noor Jehan as Chaudhvin
 Yasmin as Ghalib's wife
 Shola as Khursheed Bai
 Shamim Bano as Chaudhvin's mother
 Khursheed Shahid
 Habib Jalib (special appearance)

Soundtrack

Release and reception 
Ghalib (film) released on 24 November 1961 in cinemas of Karachi and Lahore. The film was an average grosser at the box office. Film received mixed response from critics with Dawn praised its production and compared it with Indian film based on Ghalib stating, "…[T]he film Ghalib has aroused such varied opinion. The film, to say the least, is truly enchanting, and as perfect a production as the Indian Mirza Ghalib for which the hero won the Indian President’s Award."

Awards and nominations 
 1961 - Nigar Awards - Best Supporting Actress - Shamim Bano

References

External links 
 

Pakistani biographical drama films
Films scored by Tassaduq Hussain
1960s Urdu-language films
Urdu-language Pakistani films
Pakistani black-and-white films
Nigar Award winners